Edward Clinton, Baron Clinton (1624 – 1657) was an English politician who sat in the House of Commons  from 1646 to 1648.

Clinton was the son of Theophilus Clinton, 4th Earl of Lincoln, 12th Baron Clinton and his wife, the Hon. Bridget Fiennes, daughter of William Fiennes, Viscount Say and Sele.

In 1646 Clinton was elected Member of Parliament for Callington in the Long Parliament. He sat until 1648 when he was excluded under Pride's Purge
 
Clinton died in London at the age of 33.

Clinton  married Lady Anne Holles by 1652. Their son was Edward Clinton, 5th Earl of Lincoln, 13th Baron Clinton.

References

1624 births
1657 deaths
English MPs 1640–1648
Place of birth missing
Heirs apparent who never acceded
British courtesy barons and lords of Parliament
Edward
Members of the Parliament of England for Callington